The Men's super combined competition of the 2022 Winter Paralympics was held at the Yanqing National Alpine Skiing Centre on 7 March 2022.

Medal table

Visually impaired
In the super combined visually impaired, the athlete with a visual impairment has a sighted guide. The two skiers are considered a team, and dual medals are awarded.

Standing

Sitting

See also
Alpine skiing at the 2022 Winter Olympics

References

Men's super combined